Cox Bluff is the ocean end of the New Harbour Range, on the south coast of Tasmania.  It is situated on the west side of Cox Bight, and east of New Harbour, located at the south-west corner of Tasmania, Australia.

The cape is bound to the south by the Southern Ocean and is located east of South West Cape.

Peter Dombrovskis had utilised a climb of the range to get photographs of the Cox Bight beach in 1987.

See also

 South East Cape
 South Coast Track

References

South West Tasmania
Headlands of Tasmania
South coast of Tasmania